A cerebroprotectant (formerly known as a neuroprotectant) is a drug that is intended to protect the brain after the onset of acute ischemic stroke. As stroke is the second largest cause of death worldwide and a leading cause of adult disability, over 150 drugs tested in clinical trials to provide cerebroprotection.

Approved drugs 
Tissue plasminogen activator (also known as tPA, t-PA, rtPA, Activase, or Alteplase or Actilyse) is a drug that breaks down blood clots.  It was first approved in 1996, yet this drug has no generic competition. US sales of the drug under the brand name Activase and a similar drug were approximately US$1.3 billion in 2021, while European sales under the brand name Actilyse were an additional 448 million Euro in 2019.
Edaravone (radicut) was approved in Japan in 2001. It has an unknown mechanism of action, but is hypothesized to act through its antioxidant properties.

Drugs in development

Approval rate 

While over 150 cerebroprotectants have been tested in clinical trials, as of 2022 only the above two cerebroprotectants are approved, though several clinical trials for other drugs are ongoing. The approval rate has been less than 2%, which is low compared to the overall approval rate of all drugs brought into clinical trials in all disease areas from 2011 to 2022 which was 7.9%. It is also much lower than the relatively high success rate for devices to treat acute ischemic stroke, as there have been at least 5 different clot removal devices approved since 2015.

Methods to increase approval rate 

There are many theories as to the causes of the low approval rate for cerebroprotectants, and many strategies have been suggested in publications to improve the chance of approval of drugs in development. The strategies that journals suggest to improve the chance of approval in clinical trials are outlined below:

Choose the right targets Continuous research into the pathophysiology of stroke has led to improved ability to select drugs targets. Acute ischemic strokes start when there is reduced blood flow, often caused by an occlusion, to part of the brain. Even if an occlusion causes a complete blockage of a major artery, there is typically still some blood flow downstream of the blockage through collateral blood vessels. With reduced blood flow, there is reduced oxygen supply, and to compensate the tissue goes through anaerobic metabolism which is much less efficient. If anaerobic metabolism does not provide enough energy, there is energy failure, followed by ion imbalances. Afterwards, the pathophysiology gets complicated and there are thought to be at least eight pathways of tissue damage. By targeting processes near the top of the top of the chain of events, problems further down the chain of events can be avoided. For example, the drug tPA and mechanical thrombectomy devices all target the occlusion which is at the top of the chain of events, and have achieved FDA approval. The next step in the chain of events is hypoxia, and some oxygen delivery drugs have shown strong effects in animal studies, as shown in the table below. If processes further down the chain of events get targeted, there may be many simultaneous problems and the effect of a single therapy may be less, so there may be benefit to using multiple drugs in combination to treat multiple pathways.
Choose the best candidates from pre-clinical (animal) studies A 2006 analysis of studies for 1,026 therapies in stroke and theorized that the best drugs from pre-clinical studies were not the ones being brought into clinical trials. Many of the drugs with the strongest signals in pre-clinical models were not the ones later brought into clinical trials.  
Improve pre-clinical testing Others proposed that the lack of standardization in pre-clinical models made it difficult to select the best drugs. One attempt to address this comes from the National Institute of Neurological Disorders and Stroke which started the Stroke Preclinical Assessment Network to fund a testing regimen that will allow head-to-head comparisons of different drugs.
Treat patients early enough After the onset of stroke, the amount of brain tissue that dies increases over time, leading to the saying, "Time is brain." Treating patients earlier can lead to a greater amount of brain tissue being saved. 
Protect the brain for long enough An element of clinical trial design that affects the probability that a truly beneficial drug will show benefit is the duration of protection. A truly effective drug that is tested in a clinical trial where it protects the brain for a longer period of time would be expected to show a greater benefit verses a placebo than the same drug in a different clinical trial where it only protects the brain for a shorter period of time.
Select patients with salvageable tissue Another element of clinical trial design is the use of imaging biomarkers to select patients that are likely to benefit from therapy. MRI and CT imaging methods that determine whether a patient is likely to have salvageable tissue have been used to great effect in clinical trials that showed the benefit of mechanical thrombectomy devices. These same methods can be applied to clinical trials for cerebroprotective drugs.
Restore blood flow after protection so that protected tissue can survive long term If a drug protects the brain from reduced blood flow but then wears off before blood flow is normalized, then the long term effect of the drug may not be as great as it would be if the drug were paired with therapy to normalize blood flow. Pairing cerebroprotective drugs with approved methods to restore blood flow, such as tPA or mechanical thrombectomy, may increase their long term benefit.

Clinical trials

References

Drugs acting on the nervous system
Stroke